American Fall is the eleventh studio album by American punk rock band Anti-Flag, from Pittsburgh, Pennsylvania. It was released on November 3, 2017, via Spinefarm Records, making it their second record released through the label. In the US, the album debuted at No. 17 on the Hard Rock Albums chart, No. 11 on the Independent Albums chart, and No. 10 on the Tastemakers chart. The album featured cover art by artist Noah Scalin.

Track listing

Personnel 
Anti-Flag
Justin Sane – guitar, vocals, songwriter
 Chris Head – guitar, vocals, songwriter
 Chris Barker – bass, vocals, songwriter
 Pat Thetic – drums, songwriter

Production
 Benji Madden – producer
 Stevie Aiello – co-producer, songwriter
 Dan Lancaster – mixing (tracks: 1, 11)
 Brian Knapp Gardner – mastering
 Courtney Ballard – engineering
 Colin Schwanke – assistant engineering
 Patrick Kehrier – assistant engineering
 Will McCoy – assistant engineering

Artwork
 Doug Dean – artwork & design
 Nathan Inglesby – artwork
 Noah Scalin – artwork

Additional musicians
 Kevin Bivona – Hammond B3 organ (track 3)
 Brian Marquis – backing vocals
 Allie Snow – backing vocals
 Joey Briggs LaRocca  – backing vocals
 Sherry Saeedi – backing vocals
 Will Perza – backing vocals
 Justin Francis – backing vocals, mixing (tracks: 2-10)

Chart

References

External links 

2017 albums
Anti-Flag albums